Sir John Devereux Ward   (8 March 1925 – 26 June 2010) was a British Conservative Party politician.

Early life
Trained as a civil and a structural engineer, he rose to become managing director of the construction firm Taylor Woodrow.

Parliamentary career
After being beaten at Portsmouth North in October 1974, Ward served as the Member of Parliament (MP) for Poole from 1979, until his retirement in 1997. He was succeeded by Robert Syms.

After the 1988 BDH fire and explosion in Poole, he called on the government to set up a public inquiry into the incident.

From 1994 until the 1997 General Election, Ward was the Parliamentary Private Secretary to the Prime Minister, John Major. As such, he did not contribute in any debates during the last three years of his parliamentary career. Following Major's resignation as Prime Minister in May 1997, Ward was knighted in the 1997 Prime Minister's Resignation Honours.

Death
Ward died suddenly on 26 June 2010 at the age of 85.

References

External links 
 

1925 births
2010 deaths
Commanders of the Order of the British Empire
Conservative Party (UK) MPs for English constituencies
Parliamentary Private Secretaries to the Prime Minister
UK MPs 1979–1983
UK MPs 1983–1987
UK MPs 1987–1992
UK MPs 1992–1997
Knights Bachelor